This list of missing aircraft includes aircraft that have disappeared and whose locations are unknown. According to Annex 13 of the International Civil Aviation Organization, an aircraft is considered to be missing "when the official search has been terminated and the wreckage has not been located". However, there still remains a "grey area" on how much wreckage needs to be found for a plane to be declared "recovered". This list does not include every aviator, or even every air passenger that has ever gone missing as these are separate categories.

In the tables below, each missing aircraft is defined (in the Aircraft column) using one or more identifying features. If the aircraft was known by a custom or personalized name (e.g. Pathfinder), that name is presented first (in italics) followed by the aircraft type (in parentheses). The make of aircraft, although not necessarily a unique identifier, is also provided where appropriate. Aircraft registrations began to be used in the early 20th century for individual identification, so this is also included in the later tables (in parentheses).

Legend

19th century

20th century

1901–1919

1920–1939

1940–1959

1960–1979

1980–2000

21st century

2001–2019

2020–present

See also
 :Category:Missing aviators
 :Category:Missing air passengers
 :Category:Aerial disappearances of military personnel in action

References

External links
 

 
Dis
 
Dis
Aircraft